Maniago is a town and comune located in Friuli Venezia Giulia (north-eastern Italy), in Friuli. It is known principally today for production of steel blades used by producers of knives, scissors, and shears, exported worldwide.

People
 Antonio Centa
 Gian Antonio Selva
 Count Valentinis

External links
 Homepage of the city
 Online forum dedicated to Maniago and surroundings

Cities and towns in Friuli-Venezia Giulia